Diego Baldenweg with Nora Baldenweg and Lionel Baldenweg is the Swiss/Australian composer trio also firming as Great Garbo, stylised GREAT GARBO, and sometimes referred to as the Baldenweg siblings.

Career 
The three siblings Diego Baldenweg, Lionel Baldenweg, and Nora Baldenweg work together as a team: Diego Baldenweg (composer); Nora Baldenweg (co-composer); and Lionel Baldenweg (co-composer).
Together they founded the music production company GREAT GARBO in 2004. Since then the siblings have composed and produced the music to over 300 international advertising campaigns for brands such as Carlsberg, Mastercard, Nivea, Sony and Dove.

They have composed music for many films such as Otfried Preußler's bestselling children's book adaptation The Little Witch starring Karoline Herfurth; the film La femme et le TGV starring Jane Birkin; and for Til Schweiger's US remake of his German film Head Full of Honey, starring Nick Nolte, Matt Dillon and Emily Mortimer.

In 2019 they composed the entire original score to the Australian teenage sci-fi series The Unlisted (ABC/Netflix), created by Justine Flynn and produced by Polly Staniford and Angie Fielder. They also produced, arranged and performed a remake of Pink Floyd's "Another Brick in the Wall" for the opening theme.

The Baldenweg siblings have worked with orchestras like the Czech National Symphony Orchestra, Macedonian Radio Symphony Orchestra and The City of Prague Philharmonic Orchestra. Other notable collaborations include their work with American conductor David Zinman and the Tonhalle Orchestra for their score to "180°" and with British-Irish violinist Daniel Hope and the Zurich Chamber Orchestra for their score to "The Reformer Zwingli".

The Baldenwegs are voting members of the Art Directors Club, Swiss Film Academy, European Film Academy, Australian Academy of Cinema and Television Arts, Swiss Media Composers Association and the Australian Guild of Screen Composers.

Style

Diego Baldenweg, Lionel Vincent Baldenweg, and Nora Baldenweg's musical range moves within classic orchestral, subtle electronics and lyrical/non-lyrical vocals. Their logo depicts a "wheelie" garbage bin, and their name puns on Greta Garbo.

Recognition

They were the first Swiss composers to be nominated for the World Soundtrack Awards (Public Choice) in 2019.

Members 

Besides her career in music, Nora Baldenweg simultaneously held positions in fashion publishing as editor-at-large/Paris director (Russh), editor-at-large/Paris director/senior editor (Indie), editor-at-large/fashion features director (Material Girl) and was a contributing writer for Vogue Taiwan, Nylon, Dazed Digital and Wallpaper.

In May 2014 she relaunched the Paris-based magazine Modzik as editor-in-chief. In May 2017 she became editor-in-chief of UK-based magazine Lula. Since 2017 she works as a creative director (fashion) for various brands.

Films (selection)

Television (selection)

Awards and nominations 
 2006 – Winner «Best Music» EDI Awards (Federal Department of Home Affairs) – "KUONI"
 2006 – Winner «Best Music» EDI Awards (Federal Department of Home Affairs) – "Love Life – Stop Aids (Federal Office of Public Health)"
 2010 – Winner «Best Film Music» Suisa Prize Locarno International Film Festival – "180°"
 2011 – Nomination «Best Film Music» Swiss Film Award – "180°"
 2014 – Shortlist «Best Music» Art Directors Club Switzerland – "SONY"
 2015 – Shortlist «Best Music» Art Directors Club Switzerland – "SWISS LIFE"
 2017 – Finalist «Best Short Film Score» Music + Sound Awards (International) - "La Femme et le TGV"
 2018 – Finalist «Best Feature Film Score» Music + Sound Awards (International) - "The Final Touch / Die letzte Pointe"
 2018 – Winner «Best Film Music» Swiss Film Award – 
 2019 – Nomination «Best Score of the Year» World Soundtrack Awards (Public Choice) – "The Reformer Zwingli"
 2019 – Nomination «Best Original Music in TV» Australian Academy Award – AACTA – "The Unlisted"
 2020 – Nomination «Score of the Year (Top 10)» and «Best Original Score for a Drama Film» Movie Music UK Awards  – "The Reformer Zwingli".
 2020 – Nomination «Best Original Music in TV» Australian Academy Award – AACTA – "Itch (TV series)"
 2021 – Winner «ADC Bronze for Best Music» Art Directors Club Switzerland – "Swiss Film Award"
 2021 – Finalist «Best Original Composition in Branding» Music + Sound Awards (International) - "Swiss Film Award"
 2021 – Winner «Prix de la Meilleure Musique Originale» Festival International du Film Indépendent de Bordeaux, France – "The Life Underground"
 2021 – Winner «Composer of the Year - Outstanding Achievements in Film Music» 46th "Prix Walo"
 2022 – Winner «Gold: Best Supplier Services», Xaver Award for Excellence in Live Communications, Switzerland - Audio Branding: "Swiss Film Award"
 2022 – Finalist «Best Original Composition in Branding», Music + Sound Awards (International), United Kingdom - Audio Branding: "Zurich Film Festival"
 2022 – Finalist «Best Original Composition in a Short Film», Music + Sound Awards (International), United Kingdom - Film: "The Life Underground"
 2022 – Nomination «Best Original Music in TV», Australian Academy Award - AACTA, Australia - TV Series: Born to Spy
 2022 – Gewinner «Bronze: Film & Audio Craft - Music and Sound», ADC Europe Awards, Spain - Audio Branding: "Zurich Film Festival"

References

External links 
 Diego Baldenweg on IMDb
 Nora Baldenweg on IMDb
 Lionel Vincent Baldenweg on IMDb
 Movie Music International (John Mansell): Interview with Diego, Nora & Lionel Baldenweg
 Official website

Record production trios
Songwriting teams
Swiss composers
Australian composers
Sibling musical trios